Gone Forever is the third full-length studio album by American heavy metal band God Forbid. Jeff Loomis of Nevermore contributes the solo on track 7, "Soul Engraved". Track 2, "Antihero", was used in a sampler track hidden in Shadows Fall's album The War Within. Three music videos were released from this album for the tracks "Antihero", "Better Days" and the title track. The album entered the Top Independent Albums chart at number 34. The album has a different sound from their previous two albums, featuring strong thrash metal elements that would be included on all their following releases.

Track listing

Personnel
 Byron Davis – lead vocals
 Doc Coyle – lead guitar, clean vocals
 Dallas Coyle – rhythm guitar, clean vocals
 John "Beeker" Outcalt – bass guitar
 Corey Pierce – drums
 Jeff Loomis – lead guitar on track 7
 Thomas Cummings – vocals on track 7
 Michael Pinnella – keyboards on tracks 1, 4, 5 and 8
 Eric Rachel – production, engineering
 Colin Richardson – mixing
 Steve Evetts – mastering

2004 albums
God Forbid albums
Century Media Records albums
Albums with cover art by Travis Smith (artist)